Steven Paul Rudolph is an American educator, author and public speaker based in India. He is the proponent of a novel concept in education called Multiple Natures, which is a psychological framework that helps in understanding people's natures and personality traits that result in particular behavioral patterns, specifically related to learning and work.

Rudolph is the co-founder and Educational Director of Jiva Institute in Faridabad. He conducts life skills workshops and educational lectures for students, parents and educators and training sessions for academic counsellors.

Early life and education
Rudolph did his schooling from Wayne Valley High School in Wayne, New Jersey and graduated with a B.A. degree in English from the University of Florida. He started his career as a teacher at the Center for American Language, New York, and also taught English as a Foreign Language at Kanda Gaigo Gakuin (Kanda Institute of Foreign Languages) in Japan. He received his master's degree in Education from Temple University, Tokyo. In 1993. Rudolph moved to India in 1994.

Educational initiatives
In 1995, Rudolph set up the first Internet connection in an Indian school – Jiva Public School in Faridabad – through tie-ups with ERNET (Education and Research Network, Government of India), Apple Computer, and Intel. Through this initiative, he introduced the Internet into hundreds of schools across the country.

In 1997, Rudolph launched a series of modern computer books that familiarized Indian students and teachers with new uses of the computer. His books advocated computers as a tool for learning, communicating, drawing and creating music, as opposed to the existing curriculum that primarily dealt with programming languages like BASIC, operating systems like DOS, hardware, and the history of computers.

In 2001, Rudolph authored textbook materials based on Howard Gardner’s framework of Multiple Intelligences. Known as ICOT (India’s Curriculum of Tomorrow), the curriculum incorporated High Order Thinking Skills (HOTS), technology, and value-based activities.

In 2009, Rudolph authored his first book, The 10 Laws of Learning, which was specifically written for Indian parents. The book proposes a number of educational principles, which, if followed, can lead to increased levels of learning.

In 2011, he authored his second book, Solving the Ice Cream Dilemma. A book on careers, Solving the Ice Cream Dilemma is published by Times Group Books and seeks to help parents help their kids in solving their career confusion.

Multiple Natures
In June 2008, Rudolph introduced his theory of ‘Multiple Natures’, a psychological model that attempts to understand people's natures and defining personality traits. The model seeks to explain why certain people are drawn more towards certain activities and careers. It also reasons that the dominance or weakness of a particular nature is dependent on the events and circumstances faced by a person during the course of his or her life. In all, Rudolph has identified nine such natures in each person - Protective, Educative, Administrative, Creative, Healing, Entertaining, Providing, Entrepreneurial, and Adventurous.

Publications
 Project-Based Learning, Newbury House, Tokyo
 ICOT Series of Textbooks (over 50) for Jiva Institute
 The 10 Laws of Learning (2009, Random House India) 
 Solving the Ice Cream Dilemma (2011, Times Books)

Awards
 Co-winner of World Summit Award for Teledoc, an e-Health Project carried out by Jiva Institute in 2003
 ED Leadership Award by Ed Leadership Foundation in 2009

See also
 Multiple Natures

References

External links 
 Multiple Natures Website
 Ice Cream Dilemma Website

American male writers
Year of birth missing (living people)
Living people
University of Florida alumni
People from Wayne, New Jersey
Wayne Valley High School alumni
Educators from New Jersey